List of notable botanists from Slovenia

B

C

Č

D 
 Dragotin Dežman (1821–1889)

F

G

H 
 Franc de Paula Hladnik (1773–1844)

J 
 Fran Jesenko (1875–1932)

K 
 Jožef Kalasanc Erberg (1771–1843)

L

M 
 Ernest Mayer (1920–2009)

O

P 
 Angela Piskernik (1886–1967)

S 
 Giovanni Antonio Scopoli (1723–1788)

V

W

Z

See also
 List of Slovenian biologists

 
Botanists
Slovenian